North Homestead Township is a township in Barton County, Kansas, United States.  As of the 2010 census, its population was 111.

Geography
The incorporated city of Hoisington sits on the township's southern border with South Homestead Township.

References
 USGS Geographic Names Information System (GNIS)

External links
 City-Data.com

Townships in Barton County, Kansas
Townships in Kansas